The Kasimovian is a geochronologic age or chronostratigraphic stage in the ICS geologic timescale. The Kasimovian Stage follows the Moscovian and is followed by the Gzhelian.
The Kasimovian saw an extinction event which occurred around 305 mya, referred to as the Carboniferous Rainforest Collapse. It roughly corresponds to the Missourian in North American geochronology and the Stephanian in western European geochronology.

Name and definition
The Kasimovian is named after the Russian city of Kasimov. The stage was split from the Moscovian in 1926 by Boris Dan'shin (1891-1941), who gave it the name Teguliferina horizon. The name was posthumously changed in Kasimov horizon by Dan'shin in 1947. The name Kasimovian was introduced by Georgy Teodorovich in 1949.

The base of the Kasimovian Stage is at the base of the fusulinid biozone of Obsoletes obsoletes and Protriticites pseudomontiparus or with the first appearance of the ammonite genus Parashumardites. The top of the stage is close to the first appearances of the fusulinid genera Daixina, Jigulites and Rugosofusulina or the first appearance of the conodont Streptognathodus zethus.

Biozones
The Kasimovian is subdivided into three conodont biozones:
Idiognathodus toretzianus Zone
Idiognathodus sagittatus Zone
Streptognathodus excelsus and Streptognathodus makhlinae Zone

References

Literature
; 1947: Geology and Mineral Resources of Moscow and its Surroundings, Izdat. Moskov. Obshch. Isp. Prir., Moscow, 308 pp. .
; 2006: Global time scale and regional stratigraphic reference scales of Central and West Europe, East Europe, Tethys, South China, and North America as used in the Devonian–Carboniferous–Permian Correlation Chart 2003 (DCP 2003), Palaeogeography, Palaeoclimatology, Palaeoecology 240(1-2): pp 318–372.

External links
Carboniferous timescale at the website of the Norwegian network of offshore records of geology and stratigraphy
Kasimovian, GeoWhen Database

 
Pennsylvanian geochronology
Geological ages